Alfonso Callejas Deshón (1923-2017) was a politician of Nationalist Liberal Party from Nicaragua. 

He served as Vice President of Nicaragua from May 1967 to May 1972. 

Callejas was born on 27 October 1923 in Chinandega. He was trained as a civil engineer and worked in Standard Fruit Company before founding his own business. Between January and August 1966, he was Minister of Development and Public Works in Somoza cabinet. He was then appointed as Vice President of Nicaragua. In 1972, he broke with Anastasio Somoza Debayle. He went into exile in Honduras. After the 1979 revolution, Callejas returned, but went againt into exile after his properties were confiscated. 

He lived in voluntary exile from 1980 to 1990, when he returned to Nicaragua. From 1995 to 2000 he was a magistrate in the Supreme Electoral Council and in 2003 appointed Secretary for Political Affairs of the Presidency by Enrique Bolaños.

He died in August 2017 in Chinandega.

References 

Vice presidents of Nicaragua
Nationalist Liberal Party politicians
Government ministers of Nicaragua
Santa Clara University alumni
1923 births
2017 deaths